Taxation in Israel include income tax, capital gains tax, value-added tax and land appreciation tax. The primary law on income taxes in Israel is codified in the Income Tax Ordinance. There are also special tax incentives for new immigrants to encourage aliyah.

Following Israel’s social justice protests in July 2011, Prime Minister Benjamin Netanyahu created the Trajtenberg Committee to hold discussions and make recommendations to the government's socio-economic cabinet, headed by Finance Minister Yuval Steinitz. During December 2011 the Knesset reviewed these recommendations and approved a series of amendments to Israel's tax law. Among the amendments were the raising of the corporate tax rate from 24% to 25% and possibly 26% in 2013. Additionally, a new top income bracket of 48% (instead of 45%) would be introduced for people earning more than NIS 489,480 per annum. People who earn more than NIS 1 million a year would pay a surtax of 2% on their income and taxation of capital gains would not be decreased to 20% but remain at 25% in 2012.

Individual tax

Filing status
As a basis for income, Israeli residents are taxed on their worldwide income, while non-residents are taxed only on their Israeli sourced income. Income includes, employment, business income and passive income from bank deposits and savings.

An individual is resident if his "center of life" is in Israel. If an individual spent 183 days or more, in Israel during the current tax year or; if an individual spent 30 days or more in Israel during the current tax year and the total days spent in Israel during the current tax year and the preceding two years were 425 days or more.

A single filer will file a single assessment, while a married couple will file a joint assessment, but may opt out if the need arises.

A year for tax purposes for individuals is a calendar year and must file their annual tax returns by the 30 April of the following year.

Tax rates

The basic rates of income tax are as follows (according to the Israeli Tax Authority). Taxes are charged based on annual income; salaries in Israel are usually discussed at the monthly rate so these are included for convenience.

Corporate tax

Filing status
A corporation is deemed to be subject to Israeli taxes if its activities are managed and controlled within the State of Israel or established under its laws. A domestic corporation is subject to taxation on its worldwide income. A foreign corporation with an Israeli subsidiary is only taxed on income derived from, accrued or received in Israel, while a non-resident company without a subsidiary is only taxed on income sourced in Israel.

A year for tax purposes is a calendar year, however businesses may request a different schedule. Businesses must file their annual tax returns five months after the end of their year.

Tax rates
As of January 2016, the corporate tax rate in Israel is 25%. On January 1, 2017 the rate was lowered to 24%, with an additional reduction on January 1, 2018 to 23%.

VAT
Value-added tax (VAT) in Israel, is applied to most goods and services, including imported goods and services. As of 1 October 2015, the standard was lowered to 17%, from 18%. Beforehand, it was raised to 18% from 17% on 2 June 2013, which it stood at after being raised from 16% on 1 September 2012.

Certain items are zero-rated like exported goods and the provision of certain services to nonresidents. The value of imported goods, for VAT purposes, includes the customs duty, purchase tax and other levies.

Multinational companies that provide services to Israel through the Internet, such as Google and Facebook, must pay the VAT tax rate.

Electronic filing of VAT is mandatory in Israel.

National insurance (Social Security)
Current rates of national insurance for employees, including health insurance and Bituah Leumi contributions (as of January 2020, in NIS)

Additionally self-employed individuals pay between 9.82% and 16.23%.

Stamp duty
Historically, Israel had a stamp duty on signed documents. Documents and duties were regulated by the 1961 "Stamp Tax on Documents" (Law 5731-1961), the 1965 "Stamp Tax on Documents Regulations", and subsequent Additions. Documents below a certain value could be self-stamped at a postal-bank; in 2004, this threshold value was raised from 62,500 NIS to 125,000 NIS. As of 2006 this tax is no longer collected.

Israel has no other stamp-based taxes.

New immigrants and returning citizens
New immigrants and returning citizens are entitled to various benefits granted by the Tax Ordinance. These benefits were extended in 2008 in commemoration of Israel's 60th anniversary to try further to provide incentives for Jews to make Aliyah. A returning citizen is someone who has either resided overseas for at least 10 years; or resided overseas for 5 years and returned to Israel during 2007-2009; or were considered foreign residents on January 1, 2007.  Special benefits also exist for returning scientists, and entrepreneurs. The law was introduced in order to persuade many Israelis, who had made yerida (left the state of Israel) to return. These tax benefits are offered to new immigrants who made Aliyah after January 1, 2007 as follows:

10 Year Tax Exemptions for Companies Managed by Returning residents or New Immigrants
Returning residents or new immigrants who own and manage a foreign company that is active abroad, or own its shares, will no longer be automatically subject to Israeli taxes. Thus, the company will be able to continue generating tax-free revenues, so long as these revenues are not generated in Israel.

10 Year Exemption from Reporting Earnings Whose Source is from Abroad
Returning residents or new immigrants, and the companies that are under their direction, are not obligated to report earnings that benefit from exemption. Only income from activities in Israel and from Israeli investments and assets that is generated following Aliyah or return to the country is subject to reporting and taxation according to regular tax laws.

Expansion of tax benefits for returning citizen and new immigrant
Returning residents and new immigrants will now be exempt from taxes for 10 years on income generated outside Israel. This covers all income, active or passive, such as interest, dividends, pensions, royalties and rental of assets. All income, whether from the realization of assets and investments abroad or from regular income abroad, is tax exempt.

Pension benefits for returning residents and new immigrants
New immigrant will be exempt from paying taxes on their pension. Returning residents will be exempt from paying taxes on their pension for a period of 10 years.

Tax benefits for new immigrant
New immigrants will enjoy tax deductions based on the following division:
 During the first 18 months – 3 tax credit points.
 During the following year – 2 points.
 During the third year – 1 point.

Tax benefits for new immigrants on interest from foreign currency deposits
New Immigrants are entitled to exemption from paying tax on interest on foreign currency deposits for 20 years, so long as the source of those deposits is capital they possessed prior to their immigration, and which was deposited in an Israeli banking institution.

An adjustment year
New immigrants and returning residents can fill an application form for an adjustment year. During the year they will not be considered Israeli citizens for tax purposes. At the end of the year, If they decide to stay in Israel they will enjoy all the benefits that are part of the new tax reform.

References

External links
Israeli Income Tax Calculator
Israeli Tax News
Israeli Tax Articles 
Israeli Tax Authority 

 
Economy of Israel
Law of Israel